June 2 - Eastern Orthodox Church calendar - June 4

All fixed commemorations below celebrated on June 16 by Orthodox Churches on the Old Calendar.

For June 3rd, Orthodox Churches on the Old Calendar commemorate the Saints listed on May 21.

Saints
 Hieromartyrs Lucian the bishop, Maxianus the presbyter, Julian the deacon, and Martyrs Marcellinus and Saturninus, at Beauvais in Gaul (c. 81-96)
 Martyrs Lucillian and those with him, at Byzantium (c. 270-275):
 Four youths — Claudius, Hypatius, Paul, and Dionysius — and the virgin Paula.
 Saint Achillas, Bishop of Alexandria (312) 
 Saint Hieria, widow, of Mesopotamia (312) 
 Monk-martyr Barsabas, Abbot, of Ishtar, and ten companions, in Persia (342) 
 Venerable Pappos, Bishop of Chytri (Kythrea), Cyprus (368)
 Monk-martyr Isaac of Córdoba (851)
 Venerable Athanasius the Wonderworker, hieromonk of Traiannou Monastery in Bithynia (c. 933)

Pre-Schism Western saints
 Saint Cominus, a companion of St Photinus (Pothinus) and martyr in Lyons, France (2nd century)
 Saints Pergentinus and Laurentinus, two brothers martyred in Arezzo in Italy under Decius (251)
 Saint Caecilius (Caecilian), a priest in Carthage in North Africa who converted St Cyprian to Christ (3rd century)
 Saint Oliva of Anagni, a nun at Anagni near Rome (492)
 Saint Hilary (Hilaire), Bishop of Carcassonne in France (5th century))
 Saint Clotilde (Chlotilda), Queen of France, who completed the basilica of St. Genevieve at Paris (545)
 Venerable Liphardus (Lifard), a prominent lawyer in Orleans in France, who at the age of fifty founded the monastery of Meung-sur-Loire, Confessor (c. 550)
 Venerable Urbicius, fellow ascetic of St. Liphardus, became abbot of the monastery of Meung-sur-Loire (6th century)
 Venerable Cronan, a disciple of St Kevin in Ireland (617)
 Saint Kevin of Glendalough (Coemgen, Caoimhghin), hermit and abbot, of Glendalough, Ireland (618)
 Saint Genesius of Clermont, Bishop of Clermont in Auvergne in France (662)
 Saint Glunshallaich, a repentant man in Ireland, converted by St Kevin and buried with him at Glendalough (7th century)
 Saint Gausmarus, Abbot of St Martin of Savigny in France from 954-984 (984)
 Saint Davinus, pilgrim, confessor (1051)

Post-Schism Orthodox saints
 New Hieromartyr Joseph III (Antonopoulos), Metropolitan of Thessalonica (1821)
 New Hieromartyr Gregory of Derkon, Metropolitan of Derkon, near the Istanbul suburb of St Stephen (1821)
 New Hieromartyr Dorotheos of Adrianople, Metropolitan of Adrianople (1821)

New martyrs and confessors
 New Hieromartyr Cyprian (Nelidov), Hieromonk, of Moscow (1934)
 New Hieromartyr Michael Markov, Priest (1938)

Other commemorations
 Translation of the relics (1606) of the martyred Crown Prince Demetrius (1591), from Uglich to Moscow.
 Icon of the Theotokos "Yugskaya" (1615)
 Repose of Archimandrite Justin (Pârvu) of Petru Vodă Monastery, Romania (2013)

Icon gallery

Notes

References

Sources
 June 3/16. Orthodox Calendar (PRAVOSLAVIE.RU).
 June 16 / June 3. HOLY TRINITY RUSSIAN ORTHODOX CHURCH (A parish of the Patriarchate of Moscow).
 June 3. OCA - The Lives of the Saints.
 The Autonomous Orthodox Metropolia of Western Europe and the Americas (ROCOR). St. Hilarion Calendar of Saints for the year of our Lord 2004. St. Hilarion Press (Austin, TX). p. 41.
 The Third Day of the Month of June. Orthodoxy in China.
 June 3. Latin Saints of the Orthodox Patriarchate of Rome.
 The Roman Martyrology. Transl. by the Archbishop of Baltimore. Last Edition, According to the Copy Printed at Rome in 1914. Revised Edition, with the Imprimatur of His Eminence Cardinal Gibbons. Baltimore: John Murphy Company, 1916. pp. 162–163.
 Rev. Richard Stanton. A Menology of England and Wales, or, Brief Memorials of the Ancient British and English Saints Arranged According to the Calendar, Together with the Martyrs of the 16th and 17th Centuries. London: Burns & Oates, 1892. pp. 252–253.
Greek Sources
 Great Synaxaristes:  3 ΙΟΥΝΙΟΥ. ΜΕΓΑΣ ΣΥΝΑΞΑΡΙΣΤΗΣ.
  Συναξαριστής. 3 Ιουνίου. ECCLESIA.GR. (H ΕΚΚΛΗΣΙΑ ΤΗΣ ΕΛΛΑΔΟΣ). 
  03/06/2017. Ορθόδοξος Συναξαριστής. 
Russian Sources
  16 июня (3 июня). Православная Энциклопедия под редакцией Патриарха Московского и всея Руси Кирилла (электронная версия). (Orthodox Encyclopedia - Pravenc.ru).
  3 июня по старому стилю / 16 июня по новому стилю. Русская Православная Церковь - Православный церковный календарь на 2016 год.
  3 июня (ст.ст.) 16 июня 2014 (нов. ст.). Русская Православная Церковь Отдел внешних церковных связей. (DECR).

June in the Eastern Orthodox calendar